The Avenger is a 1937 Australian film directed by A. R. Harwood.

Plot
A reformed thief marries a wealthy socialite but is haunted by a former accomplice who tries to frame him for murder.

Cast
Douglas Stuart as Terry Druton
John Fernside	as Max Hart
Karen Greyson as Della, the Maid
Marcia Melville as Gwen
Marshall Crosby as Detective Sergeant O'Neill
George Lloyd as Happy Evans
Raymond Longford as Warren
Pat Twohill as Solicitor

Production
The movie was produced by New Era Film Productions, a new production company that had been established in Melbourne by Morrell Wright and Cyril J. Turner. A. R. Harwood was director of production.

Filming started in October 1937 and took place at Pagewood Studios in Sydney, while some exterior filming took place at Parramatta.

Release
The movie was ready for trade preview by 17 December 1937 and was distributed in Australia by Atlas Films. It only achieved limited release.

However the film was sold to Columbia for release in the UK, the last Australian film to be admitted under the old British quota law which allowed Australian movies to qualify as local ones. Harwood said this sale recouped 45% of the film's production cost. This was a good enough result for New Era to make another feature, Show Business (1938).

References

External links
 The Avenger at IMDb
 The Avenger at National Film and Sound Archive
The Avenger at Oz Movies

1937 films
Australian black-and-white films